Julia Aviva Hahn (born April 1, 1991) is an American writer. Between 2017 and 2021, she was deputy communications director in the Trump White House.

Early life
Hahn was born to a Jewish family, and grew up in Beverly Hills. She attended Harvard-Westlake School in Los Angeles. Her grandfather is Harold Honickman, the head of a successful soft-drink bottling company, who in 2002 was estimated to be worth $850 million.

Hahn attended the University of Chicago, studying philosophy. While a student, she also studied in Paris. Hahn's senior thesis at the University of Chicago was on "issues at the intersection of psychoanalysis and post-Foucauldian philosophical inquiry".

Career
Hahn started her career as producer for The Laura Ingraham Show, eventually becoming executive producer of the show. Hahn then became press secretary for Virginia Congressman Dave Brat.

In 2015, Hahn began working at Breitbart News as a writer. She followed Steve Bannon to the White House, becoming his deputy policy strategist. She remained in the White House after Bannon's departure and worked in a communications position. She wrote headlines such as "Republican-Led Congress Oversees Large-Scale Importation of Somali Migrants."

According to The New York Times, on entering the White House at age 25, Hahn's financial disclosure forms indicate she had some $1.5 million in stocks including investments in PepsiCo and the State of Israel, as well as a Custodial Bank Account for minors containing between $500,000–$1 million.

In August 2020, The New York Times reported that Hahn compiled White House Press Secretary Kayleigh McEnany's briefing binder for her White House press briefings.

In January 2021, Hahn was hired on U.S. Senator Bill Hagerty's staff.

Controversy 
In October 2020, the Southern Poverty Law Center published a report to its Hatewatch blog based on leaked emails by Hahn’s former colleague at Breitbart News, Katie McHugh. The article alleged that Hahn had connections to prominent white nationalists during her time as a Breitbart reporter and producer for Laura Ingraham. In response to the story, the White House issued a statement on Hahn’s behalf, saying that she "condemns racism and hatred in all forms" and describing the emails as "cherry-picked."

References

1991 births
Living people
People from Beverly Hills, California
21st-century American journalists
American women journalists
Jewish American journalists
University of Chicago alumni
Breitbart News people
Trump administration personnel
Harvard-Westlake School alumni
21st-century American women